Muhammad Ali vs. Leon Spinks was a professional boxing match contested on February 15, 1978 in Las Vegas, Nevada, for the WBA, WBC, and The Ring heavyweight championship.

Background
After his unanimous decision victory against Earnie Shavers, Muhammad Ali decided to face 1976 Olympic Gold medalist Leon Spinks, knowing that he would have to face Ken Norton for the fourth time or lose his WBC belt, after the No. 1 ranked Norton beat No. 2 ranked Jimmy Young in a title eliminator in November 1977.

The fight
Before a sellout crowd of 5,298 that produced a gate of $756,300, The 10–1 underdog Spinks ended up winning two of the scorecards 145–140 and 144–141, while the third was 142–143 giving him a split decision win.  Spinks became the Undisputed Heavyweight Champion after only eight professional bouts, and the only man ever to take a world title away from Ali in the ring, as Ali's other losses were either non-title bouts or world title fights where Ali was the challenger.

Aftermath
The bout was named The Ring magazine upset of the year.

The final round (15) was named The Ring magazine round of the year.

Sports Illustrated covered the bout, and with the historic upset put Leon Spinks on the magazine cover. Spinks was later stripped of his WBC heavyweight title on March 18, 1978 for refusing to fight No. 1 contender  Norton.  Instead, Spinks signed for a rematch with Ali  at the Louisiana Superdome in New Orleans. The rematch took place on September 15, 1978, for the World Boxing Association and Lineal Heavyweight Champion titles.  Ali regained the title with a unanimous decision over Spinks.

Quotes
'Could this be the last time we see Muhammad Ali in the ring' - Brent Musburger who called this bout for CBS.
'Muhammad Ali is the greatest, but today I'm the latest' - Leon Spinks after his bout with Ali.

Undercard
Confirmed bouts:

References

Spinks
1978 in boxing
February 1978 sports events in the United States
World Boxing Association heavyweight championship matches
World Boxing Council heavyweight championship matches
Boxing in Las Vegas
Boxing
Westgate Las Vegas